Baby Faced Killer is the second solo album of British rock singer David Byron. It was his first since being sacked by Uriah Heep.

Track listing
All tracks by Daniel Boone and David Byron.
 "Baby Faced Killer"   – 3:10
 "Rich Man's Lady"     – 3:51
 "Sleepless Nights"     – 3:48
 "African Breeze"     – 4:12
 "Everybody's Star"     – 4:20
 "Heaven Or Hell"    – 4:42
 "Only You Can Do It"    – 4:04
 "Don't Let Me Down"    – 3:21
 "Acetylene Jean"    – 3:19
 "I Remember"    – 4:08

Additional tracks not included on release
 "Down On My Luck"    – 2:51 / B-side of "African Breeze" single
 "All in Your Mind"     – 2:52 / B-side of "Rich Man's Lady" single

Personnel
David Byron - lead vocals
Stuart Elliott - drums
Alan Jones - bass
Daniel Boone - guitars, keyboards, percussion
Barry Desouza - drums
Lester Fry - timpanis, chimes
Mick Box appears as a guest lead guitarist on 'I Remember'
Lelly Boone, Gabriele Byron, Alyson Mcinness, Muff Murfin, Brad Davies - backing vocals
Technical
Arranged & Produced by - David Byron and Daniel Boone (by Courtesy of Boone Productions Ltd.)
Engineered by - Brad Davies (The Old Smithy) & David Baker (Lansdowne)
Mixed at Berwick Street Studios by Brad Davies, "Sleepless Nights" remixed at Lansdowne by David Baker
Mastered by - George Marino (Sterling Sound, NY)

References

David Byron albums
1978 albums
Arista Records albums